"She Don't Know", is a 2022 song by Jade Eagleson.

She Don't Know may also refer to:

 "She Don't Know", a song by Usher from the album Raymond v. Raymond, 2010
 "She Don't Know", a 2019 song by Millind Gaba

See also
 She Doesn't Know (disambiguation)